The USCGC Roanoke Island is the 46th Island class cutter to be commissioned.
She was commissioned in Homer, Alaska, on February 7, 1992.
Five other Island Class cutters are based in Alaska.
Her primary missions include "search and rescue, fisheries enforcement and homeland security."

In 2010 the Roanoke rescued a fishing vessel called Wahoo, when it became disable during bad weather near Pearl Island.

On October 25, 2012, following a 135-day refit in a drydock in Ketchikan, Coast Guard Alaska explained the refit would allow the vessel to remain service until she was replaced by a new Sentinel class cutter.
Nevertheless, the Homer News reported that the Roanoke would leave Homer by the end of June, 2015, for her decommissioning in Baltimore, Maryland.
A sister ship, the Sapelo, previously stationed in San Juan, Puerto Rico, will replace her.  The Sapelo will be freed up as the Island class cutters in San Juan are replaced by new Sentinel-class cutters.

Decommissioning

On June 4, 2015, Roanoke Island was decommissioned at a ceremony held in homeport of Homer, Alaska. The ship was then transferred to the Coast Guard Yard in Baltimore, Maryland for disposal.

Costa Rican service

On October 13, 2017, Roanoke Island was transferred to Costa Rica. After refitting through the State Department's Foreign Military Sales program, she was recommissioned General Juan Rafael Mora Porras (GC110-1).

References

External links

Roanoke
Patrol vessels of the United States
Ships of the United States Coast Guard
Ships built in Lockport, Louisiana
1992 ships
Ships transferred from the United States Coast Guard to the Costa Rica Civil Guard Coast Guard